Go My Way may refer to:
 "Go My Way" (Hitomi Yaida song), a 2006 single from Japanese pop/folk rock singer-songwriter Hitomi Yaida's album It's a New Day
 "Go My Way" a song from Swiss heavy metal band Krokus's 2003 album Rock the Block
Go My Way!!, a song from The Idolmaster (video game).

See also 
 Going My Way